Richard Thomas Marshall  (born December 12, 1984) is a former American football cornerback. He was drafted by the Carolina Panthers in the second round (58th overall) of the 2006 NFL Draft. He played college football at Fresno State. Marshall also played for the Arizona Cardinals, Miami Dolphins, and San Diego Chargers.

Early years
Marshall attended Alain Leroy Locke Senior High School in Los Angeles, California and won All-League and All-CIF honors.

Professional career

Carolina Panthers
During his rookie season, Marshall played in portions of all 16 games. Marshall spent the first part of his career in the nickelback role, playing behind Chris Gamble and Ken Lucas. After the 2008 playoff season, Ken Lucas was released from the team, thus promoting Richard Marshall to the starting lineup.

The NFL Network voted a play by Marshall as the "Number 1 play of the 2008 preseason". The play involved Marshall intercepting a fake field goal flick from the holder to the kicker and running it back for a touchdown.

Arizona Cardinals
Marshall signed as an unrestricted free agent with the Arizona Cardinals on July 30, 2011.

Miami Dolphins
Marshall signed a three-year contract worth 16 million dollars as an unrestricted free agent with the Miami Dolphins on March 14, 2012. In 2012, it was reported that Marshall was out with a back injury. On August 20, 2013, he was released by the Dolphins.

San Diego Chargers
On August 23, 2013, Marshall agreed to terms on a contract with the San Diego Chargers. He was released on October 27, 2014.

References

External links

Miami Dolphins bio

1984 births
Living people
Players of American football from Los Angeles
American football cornerbacks
American football safeties
Fresno State Bulldogs football players
Carolina Panthers players
Arizona Cardinals players
Miami Dolphins players
San Diego Chargers players